MagNet Bank, known as the HBW Express Savings Co-operative until 2010, is the only community bank in Hungary that practises ethical banking. It is owned by Hungarian citizens.

MagNet Bank has a network of 12 branches along its center in the capital Budapest. It offers the following financial products: retail, loan, term deposits, community banking products, online banking, debit cards, insurance.

Since 2013 September the MagNet Bank standardised the debit MasterCard. The bank has ATMs at each branch.

See also
 List of banks in Hungary

External links
Official website
 Bloomberg BusinessWeek: Company Overview of MagNet Bank Zrt.
 Reuters.com: Italy's Banco Popolare sells Hungarian unit

Banks of Hungary
Banks established in 1995
Ethical banking